Our Souvenir was the fourth music CD and first full album for Twins and was released in May 2002. It consisted of 10 songs and 1 bonus VCD which contained 2 music videos.

CD Content

Disc 1
"Our Memoriable Album" (我們的紀念冊) (The advertisement theme song for Clean & Clear)   
”Duo World Cup" (二人世界盃)        
"Leslie Cheung" (哥哥)   
"Saw You In My Dream" (發夢見過你)   
"Tears in the Eyes" (眼紅紅)        
"Friendship comes First" (友誼第一)   
"Active Teaching Approach (活動教學) 
"Real Madrid vs Barcelona" (高手看招)   
"Can’t get 100marks" (沒法做足一百分)   
"Swallows fly apart" (分飛燕)

Disc 2
"Er Ren Shi Jie Bei" (二人世界盃) (Music Video)   
"Peng You Zi" (朋友仔) (Bonus Track)

2002 albums
Twins (group) albums